Healthcare in Saint Helena is provided by the Health Directorate on the British island of Saint Helena which has a staff of about 250.  In 1957 two medical officers and a dentist were part of the colony's establishment.

Facilities
The directorate manages a small general hospital with 54 beds, a dispensary, a  complex for care of the elderly,  centres for the acute and chronically mentally infirm and the mentally and physically handicapped. There are several outpatient clinics, a pharmacy and laboratory, and dental care. There are six rural health clinics which are visited regularly by the doctors, dentist and community nurses. The resident staff include a senior medical officer, three medical officers and a dentist with annual visits by an optometrist and ophthalmic surgeon.

In 2006 the service had a portable x-ray machine, a Siemens ultrasound and a retinal camera. About 20 patients a year are referred, usually to Cape Town, for scans.

If necessary, serious or complex cases are transferred to South Africa or the United Kingdom. From 2017, the Saint Helena Airport makes transport much faster and enables fast air evacuation of serious cases. Before this, all travel from the island were done through the RMS ship which called once per three weeks and took a week one way.

Charges
Charges are payable for treatment.  Costs for primary care for the local population, and emergency treatment for UK residents are  modest, and rise to a maximum of £183.95 (2016 scale) for surgery.  For visitors and non residents they are much more substantial, with a maximum of £2880.20 (2014 scale) for surgery.  Comprehensive medical insurance is compulsory for visitors and non-residents.

Expenditure
The British Government's Department for International Development provides support and advice to the St Helena government and produced a  report on  Cost-effective Delivery of Specialist Medical Services to the St. Helena Population in 2006. The report showed that expenditure on health had risen from £1,154,675 in 1993/4 to £2,050,830 in 2000/1, but was still less than 50% of the level spent on health care in the UK.  Between 2000 and 2006 cancer was the most costly diagnosis in terms of referral to services off the island (45% of total cost) followed by cardiology (13%), spinal (10%), urology (8%) and orthopaedic diagnoses (8%). These 5 diagnoses accounted for 84% of the total referral cost. 

The total referral cost increased by a factor of 4 between 2004 and 2005.  106 referrals were expected in 2006 where the average for earlier years was about 35.  Between 2000 and 2004 the average cost of a referral was £4,000 but in 2005 it was over £12,000. The average age of patients referred also increased from 35 to 56.

Health
Life expectancy is 3-3.5 years less than the United Kingdom. The Infant Mortality Rate has been reduced from  44.7 per thousand live births in 1981 to 3.9 in 2000/1.

Income inequality on the island is modest. The highest salary is 4.6 times that of the lowest paid person in full-time employment.

Health Management 
The Clinical and public health activities are led by the Government chief medical officer  Dr Kamar Tanyan a medical Doctor holder of Master of Public Health from the University of Newcastle, Australia and Master of Science in disaster Medicine from Università del Piemonte Orientale, Italy. The senior Medical officer in St Helena is the most senior government advisor on public health and clinical matters.

References

Saint Helena
Health in Saint Helena